Dean Brett (born 8 December 1992) is a Scottish footballer who plays as a right back or midfielder for Bonnyrigg Rose Athletic.

Career
Brett made his debut for Cowdenbeath in the 2009–10 season.

In February 2017 he was suspended by the club after he admitted breaching professional conduct rules on gambling, before being sacked four days later. He had earlier received a four-match ban from the Scottish Football Association for homophobic tweets.

On 8 March 2017 Brett signed for Bonnyrigg Rose Athletic until the end of the season. After leaving the club at the end of his contract, Brett returned to senior football, signing for Scottish League Two club Montrose on 11 June 2017. Brett, however, left the club less than three weeks after joining, citing lengthy travel times to and from the club as his main motivation behind quitting.

Shortly after leaving Montrose, Brett re-signed for SJFA East Superleague side Bonnyrigg Rose Athletic.

Personal life
In January 2015 his girlfriend died from cancer; their newborn daughter had died in 2014.

References

1992 births
Living people
Scottish footballers
Cowdenbeath F.C. players
Bonnyrigg Rose Athletic F.C. players
Montrose F.C. players
Scottish Football League players
Scottish Professional Football League players
Association football fullbacks
Association football midfielders